The Queipa Revolution was a military uprising that took place in Venezuela on 2 March 1898, after 1897 when Joaquín Crespo organized electoral fraud to ensure the victory of his ally, Ignacio Andrade. The defeated candidate and leader José Manuel Hernández, better known as Mocho Hernández, rose up against Crespo. 

The rebel army quickly grew to 1,600 fighters, while the government had 2,000, including loyalist caudillo militias. The Minister of War, Antonio Fernández, also scored a victory on June 5, defeating 600 rebels. Andrade commissioned  to carry out the campaign, who defeated and captured Hernández on June 12 in El Hacha, Yaracuy state.

See also 

 Restorative Liberal Revolution

References 

1890s in Venezuela
Wars involving Venezuela